Franc-Rado Razinger (born 3 December 1944) is a Slovenian ice hockey player. He competed in the men's tournament at the 1968 Winter Olympics.

References

1944 births
Living people
Slovenian ice hockey defencemen
Olympic ice hockey players of Yugoslavia
Ice hockey players at the 1968 Winter Olympics
Sportspeople from Jesenice, Jesenice
Yugoslav ice hockey defencemen
HK Acroni Jesenice players